Era is a reservoir located in the Atsbi Wenberta woreda of the Tigray Region in Ethiopia. The earthen dam that holds the reservoir was built in 1997 by SAERT.

Dam characteristics 
 Dam height: 16.73 metres
 Spillway width: 10 metres

Capacity 
 Original capacity: 1 920 000 m³
 Dead storage: 480 000 m³
 Reservoir area: 37 ha

Irrigation 
 Designed irrigated area: 100 ha
 Actual irrigated area in 2002: 95 ha

Environment 
The catchment of the reservoir is 16 km² large. The reservoir suffers from rapid siltation. Part of the water that could be used for irrigation is lost through seepage; the positive side-effect is that this contributes to groundwater recharge.

References 

Reservoirs in Ethiopia
1997 establishments in Ethiopia
Tigray Region